Dusti District (before 2016: Jilikul District) is a district in Khatlon Region, Tajikistan. Its capital is the village Jilikul. The population of the district is 117,100 (January 2020 estimate).

Administrative divisions
They are as follows:

References

Districts of Khatlon Region
Districts of Tajikistan